Indiana Jones and the Last Crusade: The Action Game was published in 1989 by Lucasfilm Games, based on the film of the same name. The game was released for the ZX Spectrum, Amstrad CPC, Commodore 64, Atari ST, Amiga, IBM PC, MSX, Master System, NES, Game Boy, Sega Genesis and Game Gear.

It is a different game from Indiana Jones and the Last Crusade: The Graphic Adventure, also released in 1989. There is also a different game for the Nintendo Entertainment System titled Indiana Jones and the Last Crusade, released by Taito in 1991.

Gameplay

As in the film, the player's quest is to find the Holy Grail. En route, the player must find the Cross of Coronado, the Knight of the First Crusade's Shield and Henry Jones, Sr.'s Grail Diary.

Reception

Computer Gaming World gave the game a negative review and said it was "just another search and recover game" with little to do with Indiana Jones. The review praised the graphics and sound, but found the fight sequences both too easy and too short, since all enemies could be defeated in one hit and turned their backs shortly after attacking the player. Compute! liked the Commodore 64 version, approving of the graphics and describing gameplay as "quite addicting", but criticizing lack of savegame and replay value.

It reached number one in the UK charts, replacing RoboCop which had held the top spot for a record 36 weeks.

Nintendo Power, reviewing the NES version, praised the action gameplay and noted that the music and levels helped recreate the feel of the movie. Nintendo Power was not impressed with the character graphics but stated that the animation "is quite good" for the NES. Nintendo Power praised the Game Boy version for its graphics, password system, and challenging gameplay, but criticized the poor "hit detection" and the time limits on each level, both of which made the game more difficult. The action game features six levels and a password feature. Game Players rated the NES version 52 percent.

References

External links
 
 

1989 video games
Amiga games
Amstrad CPC games
Atari ST games
Commodore 64 games
DOS games
Game Boy games
Action Game
Last Crusade: The Action Game
Master System games
MSX games
Nintendo Entertainment System games
Platform games
Game Gear games
Sega Genesis games
U.S. Gold games
Video game sequels
Video games set in Austria
Video games set in the United States
Video games set in Utah
Video games set in Venice
ZX Spectrum games
Video games developed in the United Kingdom
Tiertex Design Studios games
Single-player video games
Ubisoft games
NMS Software games